Sergio Jerome Pettis (born August 18, 1993) is an American mixed martial artist who is currently signed with Bellator MMA, where he is the current Bellator Bantamweight Champion. Prior to signing with Bellator, Pettis competed in the Ultimate Fighting Championship (UFC), where he fought in both the Bantamweight and Flyweight divisions. As of December 13, 2022, he is #8 in the Bellator men's pound-for-pound rankings.

He holds notable victories over Kyoji Horiguchi, Joseph Benavidez, Juan Archuleta, and Brandon Moreno.

Background
Pettis was born on January 27, 1987, to Annette (née Garcia) and Eugene Pettis Jr. in Milwaukee, Wisconsin. Along with his older brother former UFC Lightweight Champion Anthony Pettis, who competes in the lightweight division, and oldest brother Reynaldo Pettis, he grew up in the south side of Milwaukee, Wisconsin.

Pettis' mother is of Mexican descent and his father is of Puerto Rican descent. To escape prejudice, his grandpa Eugenio Pérez anglicised the family name from Pérez to Pettis. Pettis was a student at Pius XI High School.

Pettis' father was fatally stabbed by a robber on November 12, 2003, at a friend's residence.

Mixed martial arts career

Early career
Pettis turned pro on September 10, 2011, against Kyle Vivian at Canadian Fighting Championship 7. He won via TKO in the first round.

On January 7, 2012, Sergio took on Mike Lindquist at Madtown Throwdown 26. He won via submission in round one.

Pettis fought Tom McKenna at LFC 53. He won via first round submission.

Pettis then took on Tony Zelinski at NAFC: Unleashed. He won via second-round TKO.

Pettis took on Chris Haney at NAFC: Colosseum. He won via unanimous decision.

In his next fight, Pettis defeated Jimmy Jones via unanimous decision at RFA 4-Griffin vs Escudero.

Pettis was originally set to face Matt Manzanares at Resurrection Fighting Alliance 7, but Manzanares was forced out of the bout due to injury. RFA could not find another opponent for Sergio, therefore the bout was scrapped. Pettis is now set to face Josh Robinson at NAFC: Battleground. Pettis improved his record to an unblemished 7–0 with the unanimous decision victory.

Resurrection Fighting Alliance announced that Pettis will take on UFC vet Jeff Curran for the inaugural RFA Flyweight Championship at RFA 8 on June 21, 2013, inside the historic The Rave/Eagles Club Milwaukee, Wisc.  Curran was forced out of the bout due to personal reasons, RFA President Ed Soares reported that Dillard Pegg will take his place and fight Pettis for the flyweight title. He won via KO in the first round to win the RFA flyweight title.

Pettis faced James Porter for the NAFC Bantamweight Championship, at NAFC: Battle in the Ballroom on September 28, 2013. Pettis won via first round submission and was subsequently signed by the UFC.

Ultimate Fighting Championship 
Pettis was expected to make his promotional debut against Vaughan Lee in a bantamweight bout on November 16, 2013, at UFC 167. A week before the fight Lee was forced out of the bout due to injury and was replaced by Will Campuzano. Pettis won the fight via unanimous decision.

In his second UFC bout, Pettis faced Alex Caceres at UFC on Fox 10 on January 25, 2014. He lost the back-and-forth fight via rear-naked choke submission late in the third round.  Despite the loss, Pettis won a Fight of the Night bonus award for the bout.

Pettis faced Yaotzin Meza on June 7, 2014, at UFC Fight Night: Henderson vs. Khabilov. He won the fight via unanimous decision.

Pettis faced Matt Hobar on December 6, 2014, at UFC 181. He won the fight via unanimous decision.  The bout also earned Pettis his second Fight of the Night bonus award.

Pettis faced Ryan Benoit in a flyweight bout on March 14, 2015, at UFC 185.  After winning the first round, Pettis was dropped by left hook and finished off with a flurry of ground and pound from Benoit in the second round.

Pettis faced Chris Cariaso on October 3, 2015, at UFC 192. He won the fight via unanimous decision.

Pettis faced Chris Kelades on April 23, 2016, at UFC 197. Pettis won the fight by unanimous decision. Sergio was dominating most of the exchanges and defending takedowns by attacking the neck. He stunned Moraga many times and arguably won all 3 rounds. Pettis called out Jussier Formiga in his post fight interview.

Pettis was expected to face Louis Smolka on October 1, 2016, at UFC Fight Night 96. However, Pettis pulled out of the fight during the week leading up to the event citing what his trainer described as "a minor injury" and was replaced by promotional newcomer Brandon Moreno.

Pettis was expected to face Jussier Formiga on January 15, 2017, at UFC Fight Night 103. However, Formiga pulled out of the fight in late December and was replaced by John Moraga. He won the fight via unanimous decision.

Pettis was expected to face Henry Cejudo on May 13, 2017, at UFC 211. However, on May 10, Cejudo pulled out of the fight with a hand injury and the bout was canceled.

Pettis faced Brandon Moreno on August 5, 2017, in the main event at UFC Fight Night 114. He won the bout via unanimous decision.

A rescheduled fight with Cejudo took place on December 2, 2017, at UFC 218. Pettis lost the fight by unanimous decision.

Pettis faced Joseph Benavidez on June 9, 2018, at UFC 225. He won the back-and-forth fight via split decision.

Pettis faced Jussier Formiga on October 6, 2018, at UFC 229. He lost the fight via unanimous decision  After the fight, Pettis' head coach Duke Roufus announced that Sergio is returning to the bantamweight division.

Pettis faced Rob Font in a bantamweight bout, on December 15, 2018, at UFC on Fox 31. He lost the fight via unanimous decision.

Pettis was expected to face Ricardo Ramos on June 29, 2019, at UFC on ESPN 3. However, on June 15, 2019, it was reported that Pettis pulled out of the bout due to injury.

Pettis was scheduled to face Alex Perez on September 21, 2019, at UFC on ESPN+ 17. However, Perez pulled out of the bout on August 26 citing an injury, and he was replaced by Tyson Nam. Pettis won the fight by unanimous decision.

Pettis was scheduled to face Kai Kara-France on December 14, 2019, at UFC 245. Later, news surfaced that Pettis fought out his contract with his previous fight with Nam, and is testing free agency.

Bellator MMA

On October 24, 2019, it was announced that Pettis signed a multi-fight deal with Bellator MMA. Pettis made his promotional debut at Bellator 238 on January 25, 2020, against Alfred Khashakyan. He was victorious via first round technical submission.

Pettis faced Ricky Bandejas on July 24 at Bellator 242. He won the bout via unanimous decision.

Bellator Bantamweight Championship 
Pettis faced Juan Archuleta for the Bellator Bantamweight World Championship at Bellator 258 on May 7, 2021. Pettis won the bout and the title by unanimous decision.

Pettis made his first title defense against Kyoji Horiguchi on December 3, 2021, at Bellator 272. After losing the first three rounds, Pettis came back to win the fight via knockout in round four.

For his second title defense and also the first round bout of the $1 million Bellator Bantamweight World Grand Prix Tournament, Pettis was scheduled to face Raufeon Stots on April 23, 2022, at Bellator 279. However Pettis was forced to pull out of the bout and the Grand Prix after sustaining an injury that required surgery.

Personal life 
Sergio is the youngest brother of Anthony and Rey Pettis. Sergio graduated from Pius XI Catholic High School located in Milwaukee, WI in June 2012. On November 23, 2003, their father, Eugene Pettis, Jr., was stabbed to death by a robber at a friend's house.

Championships and achievements

Mixed martial arts
Bellator MMA
Bellator Bantamweight World Championship (One time, current)
One successful title defense
Ultimate Fighting Championship
Fight of the Night (Two times) vs. Alex Caceres, Matt Hobar
Resurrection Fighting Alliance
RFA Flyweight Championship (One time, First)
North American Fighting Championship
NAFC Bantamweight Championship (One time)
Cageside Press
Comeback of the Year 2021 (tied w/Charles Oliveira) vs. Kyoji Horiguchi
ESPN
2021 Finish of the Year vs. Kyoji Horiguchi
CBS Sports
2021 Bellator Knockout of the Year vs. Kyoji Horiguchi
2021 Bellator Fighter of the Year (tied with A.J. McKee)
MMAjunkie.com
2021 December Knockout of the Month vs. Kyoji Horiguchi
2021 Knockout of the Year vs. Kyoji Horiguchi
2021 Comeback of the Year vs. Kyoji Horiguchi
Sherdog
2021 Knockout of the Year vs. Kyoji Horiguchi
LowKick MMA
2021 Comeback of the Year vs. Kyoji Horiguchi
MMASucka
2021 Knockout of the Year vs. Kyoji Horiguchi
2021 Comeback of the Year vs. Kyoji Horiguchi
Combat Press
2021 Comeback of the Year vs. Kyoji Horiguchi

Mixed martial arts record

|-
|Win
|align=center| 22–5
|Kyoji Horiguchi
|KO (spinning backfist)
|Bellator 272
|
|align=center|4
|align=center|3:24
|Uncasville, Connecticut, United States
|
|-
|Win
|align=center| 21–5
|Juan Archuleta
|Decision (unanimous)
|Bellator 258
|
|align=center|5
|align=center|5:00
|Uncasville, Connecticut, United States
|
|-
|Win
|align=center|20–5
|Ricky Bandejas
|Decision (unanimous)
|Bellator 242
|
|align=center|3
|align=center|5:00
|Uncasville, Connecticut, United States
|
|-
|Win
|align=center|19–5
|Alfred Khashakyan
|Technical Submission (guillotine choke)
|Bellator 238
|
|align=center|1
|align=center|3:00
|Inglewood, California, United States
|
|-
|Win
|align=center|18–5
|Tyson Nam
|Decision (unanimous)
|UFC Fight Night: Rodríguez vs. Stephens 
|
|align=center|3
|align=center|5:00
|Mexico City, Mexico
|
|-
|Loss
|align=center|17–5
|Rob Font
|Decision (unanimous)
|UFC on Fox: Lee vs. Iaquinta 2
|
|align=center|3
|align=center|5:00
|Milwaukee, Wisconsin, United States
|
|-
|Loss
|align=center|17–4
|Jussier Formiga
| Decision (unanimous)
|UFC 229 
|
| align=center|3
| align=center|5:00
|Las Vegas, Nevada, United States
|
|-
|Win
|align=center|17–3
|Joseph Benavidez
|Decision (split)
|UFC 225 
|
|align=center|3
|align=center|5:00
|Chicago, Illinois, United States
|
|-
|Loss
|align=center|16–3
|Henry Cejudo
|Decision (unanimous)
|UFC 218 
|
|align=center|3
|align=center|5:00
|Detroit, Michigan, United States
|
|-
|Win
|align=center|16–2
|Brandon Moreno
|Decision (unanimous)
|UFC Fight Night: Pettis vs. Moreno
|
|align=center|5
|align=center|5:00
|Mexico City, Mexico
|
|-
|Win
|align=center|15–2
|John Moraga
|Decision (unanimous)
|UFC Fight Night: Rodríguez vs. Penn
|
|align=center|3
|align=center|5:00
|Phoenix, Arizona, United States
|
|-
|Win
|align=center|14–2
|Chris Kelades
|Decision (unanimous)
|UFC 197
|
|align=center|3
|align=center|5:00
|Las Vegas, Nevada, United States
|
|-
|Win
|align=center|13–2
|Chris Cariaso
|Decision (unanimous)
|UFC 192
|
|align=center|3
|align=center|5:00
|Houston, Texas, United States
|
|-
|Loss
|align=center|12–2
|Ryan Benoit
|TKO (punches)
|UFC 185
|
|align=center|2
|align=center|1:34
|Dallas, Texas, United States
|
|-
|Win
|align=center|12–1
|Matt Hobar
|Decision (unanimous)
|UFC 181
|
|align=center| 3
|align=center| 5:00
|Las Vegas, Nevada, United States
|
|-
| Win
|align=center| 11–1
| Yaotzin Meza
| Decision (unanimous)
| UFC Fight Night: Henderson vs. Khabilov
|
|align=center| 3
|align=center| 5:00
|Albuquerque, New Mexico, United States
|
|-
| Loss
|align=center| 10–1
| Alex Caceres
| Submission (rear-naked choke)
| UFC on Fox: Henderson vs. Thomson
|
|align=center| 3
|align=center| 4:39
|Chicago, Illinois, United States
|
|-
| Win
|align=center| 10–0
| Will Campuzano
| Decision (unanimous)
| UFC 167
|
|align=center| 3
|align=center| 5:00
|Las Vegas, Nevada, United States
|
|-
| Win
|align=center| 9–0
| James Porter
| Submission (kimura)
| NAFC: Battle in the Ballroom
|September 28, 2013
|align=center|1
|align=center|2:33
|Milwaukee, Wisconsin, United States
|
|-
| Win
|align=center| 8–0
| Dillard Pegg
| TKO (punches)
| RFA 8
|June 21, 2013
|align=center|1
|align=center|0:51
|Milwaukee, Wisconsin, United States
|
|-
| Win
|align=center| 7–0
| Josh Robinson
| Decision (unanimous)
|NAFC: Battleground
|March 29, 2013
|align=center|3
|align=center|5:00
|Milwaukee, Wisconsin, United States
|
|-
| Win
|align=center| 6–0
| Jimmy Jones
| Decision (unanimous)
|RFA 4 
|November 2, 2012
|align=center|3
|align=center|5:00
|Las Vegas, Nevada, United States
|
|-
| Win
|align=center| 5–0
| Tom McKenna
| Submission (guillotine choke)
|LOF 53: Memorium
|June 16, 2012
|align=center|1
|align=center|3:52
|Indianapolis, Indiana, United States
|
|-
| Win
|align=center| 4–0
| Chris Haney 
| Decision (unanimous) 
|NAFC: Colosseum
|May 4, 2012
|align=center|3
|align=center|5:00
|Milwaukee, Wisconsin, United States
|
|-
| Win
|align=center| 3–0
| Mike Lindquist
| Submission (arm-triangle choke)
|Madtown Throwdown 26: The Return
|January 7, 2012
|align=center|1
|align=center|1:43
|Madison, Wisconsin, United States
|
|-
| Win
|align=center| 2–0
| Tony Zelinski
| TKO (head kick)
|NAFC: Unleashed
|November 18, 2011
|align=center|2
|align=center|1:59
|Milwaukee, Wisconsin, United States
|
|-
| Win
|align=center| 1–0
| Kyle Vivian
| TKO (head kick)
|CFC 7
|September 10, 2011
|align=center|1
|align=center|1:46
|Winnipeg, Manitoba, Canada
|
|-

See also
 List of current Bellator fighters
 List of male mixed martial artists

References

External links
 

1993 births
American male mixed martial artists
American male taekwondo practitioners
Sportspeople from Milwaukee
Mixed martial artists from Wisconsin
American practitioners of Brazilian jiu-jitsu
People awarded a black belt in Brazilian jiu-jitsu
American sportspeople of Puerto Rican descent
American mixed martial artists of Mexican descent
Flyweight mixed martial artists
Bantamweight mixed martial artists
Mixed martial artists utilizing taekwondo
Mixed martial artists utilizing Brazilian jiu-jitsu
Living people
Ultimate Fighting Championship male fighters